Carolyn Dunn is a Canadian actress. Her most notable role was her portrayal of Sylvie Gerard, the business partner/sidekick on Tropical Heat, which was retitled Sweating Bullets when transmitted in the United States. In 1994, she starred in Thicker Than Blood: The Larry McLinden Story.

Early life
She is a native of Whitney Pier on Cape Breton Island, Nova Scotia. As a child, Dunn was a figure skater and model. She then began her career as actress in the late-1970s.

Career
Dunn started out playing parts of defenceless blondes in romantic movies. She became recognizable thanks to the role of Sylvie Gerard in Tropical Heat. She has appeared in several roles in television, movies, and the theater. Her last credited film role was Mary in The Death of Alice Blue in 2009.

In 2008, she returned to her home town to open an alternative medicine clinic.

Filmography

Film

Television

References

External links

Canadian television actresses
Canadian female models
Actresses from Nova Scotia
People from the Cape Breton Regional Municipality
Living people
1960s births